Ohio & Erie Canalway may refer to:

 Ohio & Erie Canalway National Heritage Area, a federally designated heritage area in northeastern Ohio
 Ohio & Erie Canalway Scenic Byway, a scenic route in northeastern Ohio
 Ohio and Erie Canal Towpath Trail, a multiuse trail in northeastern Ohio

See also 
 Ohio and Erie Canal